"Ever So Lonely" is the debut single by British band Monsoon with Sheila Chandra on vocals. The song was written by Steve Coe and was released in August 1981. The single became a  12 hit in the United Kingdom following a re-release in March 1982, staying on the UK Singles Chart for nine weeks. It was also a hit in Ireland, the Netherlands and Australia but was never released as a single in the United States. Chandra was aged only 16 and had just left school when her first single was released.

The band were later signed to Phonogram after being discovered by David Claridge and the song was the first release on his new label, The Mobile Suit Corporation. Several different remixes were made including three by Monsoon, two by Ben Chapman, and several by Jakatta.

Critical reception
Reviewing the band, iTunes said:
""The band's pop songs were no different than most, but the addition of Indian instrumentation and Chandra's wonderful voice evoked images of the Orient seldom seen on the British pop charts since George Harrison's excursions with the Beatles."

Track listings

All songs written and composed by Steve Coe except where noted.

7-inch single: CORP 2

12-inch single: CORP 212

Charts

Jakatta version

"Ever So Lonely" was covered by Jakatta as "So Lonely" using Sheila Chandra's vocals, and it was released from Jakatta's 2002 album, Visions, on 4 February 2002. It surpassed the chart success of the original version, reaching a peak of No. 8 on the UK Singles Chart. It also peaked No. 15 in Spain, No. 31 in Ireland, and No. 51 in Australia.

Charts

Release history

References

See also
 List of UK top 10 singles in 2001

1981 songs
1981 debut singles
1982 singles
2002 singles
Dave Lee (DJ) songs
Ministry of Sound singles
Song recordings produced by Hugh Jones (producer)
World music songs